John Dobson, DD (30 May 1690, in Cliddesden –10 December 1724, in Oxford) was Warden of New College, Oxford, from 1720 until his death.

Dobson was educated at New College where he graduated BA in 1711, MA in 1714 and BD in 1721.

References

18th-century English people
Wardens of New College, Oxford
People from Hertfordshire
1690 deaths
1724 deaths